Emil Alfons Hagelberg (25 August 1895 – 12 August 1941) was a Finnish modern pentathlete. He competed at the 1920 and 1924 Summer Olympics and placed seventh and 25th, respectively. He served as the Olympic flag bearer for Finland in 1920.

Hagelberg was a career military officer who fought in World War I. He died in a Soviet air raid during the Continuation War in 1941.

References

External links
 

1895 births
1941 deaths
People from Pyhtää
People from Viipuri Province (Grand Duchy of Finland)
Finnish male modern pentathletes
Olympic modern pentathletes of Finland
Modern pentathletes at the 1920 Summer Olympics
Modern pentathletes at the 1924 Summer Olympics
Finnish military personnel killed in World War II
Deaths by airstrike during World War II
Russian military personnel of World War I
Finnish Army personnel
Sportspeople from Kymenlaakso